Valeri Grigoryevich Barmin (born 8 May 1963) is a Russian football coach and a former player.

Coaching career
In July 2019, he was appointed manager of FC Anzhi Makhachkala, following its two-level relegation to the Russian Professional Football League.

He was dismissed by Anzhi on 28 October 2019, following a stretch of 5 games in which Anzhi gained only 1 point and team 3rd from the bottom of the table.

References

External links
 

1963 births
Living people
Soviet footballers
Russian footballers
Association football forwards
Russian football managers
FC Anzhi Makhachkala managers
FC Amur Blagoveshchensk players